Matsumuraeses falcana is a moth of the family Tortricidae. It is found in Nepal, China, Taiwan, Japan and Vietnam.

References

Moths described in 1900
Grapholitini
Moths of Japan